Ryder is an unincorporated community in Randolph County, in the U.S. state of Missouri.

The community was named after one Mr. Ryder, the original owner of the town site.

References

Unincorporated communities in Randolph County, Missouri
Unincorporated communities in Missouri